The 2010 Malaysia Junior Hockey League (field hockey) begins on April 9, 2010. BJSS is the defending champion for both league and cup.

Teams
A total of 17 boys teams entered this season, a girls' team Malaysia women's national field hockey team is entered into the Division 1 and named as Malaysia Women Hockey Association.

Division 1
  BJSS
  BJSS Juniors
  PHK-MSS Kelantan
  Malaysia Women's Hockey Association
  UniKL
  MBPJ
  BPSS Thunderbolt
  BPSS Juniors
  MBI-Anderson School

Venues
 Alor Setar: Alor Setar Hockey Stadium  
 Klang: Pandamaran Hockey Stadium 
 Kuala Terengganu: Kuala Terengganu  Hockey Stadium
 Lembah Pantai: Kuala Lumpur Hockey Stadium, Kuala Lumpur
 Ipoh: Sultan Azlan Shah Hockey Stadium
 Seremban: Seremban Two Hockey Stadium
 Bandar Penawar: Bandar Penawar Sports School
 Jalan Duta: Tun Razak Hockey Stadium, Kuala Lumpur
 Tampin: Tampin Stadium
 Universiti Sains Malaysia: USM Stadium, Penang

Results

Division 1

First to eighth place classification

Awards

References

Malaysia Junior Hockey League
Hockey League junior